Fairfield Township is a civil township of Shiawassee County in the U.S. state of Michigan. As of the 2010 census, the township population was 755.

Communities
Carland was laid out in 1884 when the railroad was extended to that point.

Geography

Demographics
As of the census of 2000, there were 745 people, 272 households, and 205 families residing in the township. There were 288 housing units at an average density of 11.5 per square mile (4.4/km2). The racial makeup of the township was 99.06% White, 0.27% Asian, 0.13% Pacific Islander, and 0.54% from two or more races. Hispanic or Latino of any race were 0.94% of the population.

There were 272 households, out of which 35.3% had children under the age of 18 living with them, 64.7% were married couples living together, 6.6% had a female householder with no husband present, and 24.3% were non-families. 18.8% of all households were made up of individuals, and 7.0% had someone living alone who was 65 years of age or older.  The average household size was 2.74 and the average family size was 3.14.

In the township the population was spread out, with 26.7% under the age of 18, 7.7% from 18 to 24, 29.1% from 25 to 44, 24.7% from 45 to 64, and 11.8% who were 65 years of age or older.  The median age was 38 years. For every 100 females, there were 108.1 males.  For every 100 females age 18 and over, there were 106.0 males.

The median income for a household in the township was $42,188, and the median income for a family was $44,375. Males had a median income of $32,240 versus $26,750 for females. The per capita income for the township was $16,327.  About 6.7% of families and 10.2% of the population were below the poverty line, including 13.5% of those under age 18 and 2.8% of those age 65 or over.

References

Townships in Shiawassee County, Michigan
Townships in Michigan